Rabia Cirit (born 16 April 1998) is a Turkish female para-atlete competing in the F41 disability class of shot put and discus throw events.

Private life
Rabia Cirit was born in Malatya, Turkey on 16 April 1998.

Sport career
Cirit began her sport career at Samsun Canik Belediyespor in 2016. In 2017, she was admitted to the Turkey national team.

She captured two gold medals, in the shot put F41 and discus throw F41 events, at the 2018 IPC World Para-Athletics Grand Prix Italian Open in Rieti. She won the silver medal in the shot put F41 event at the third leg of the 2021 World Para-Athletics Grand Prix held in Jesolo, Italy. She broke a European record with  set on 17 April 2021, which belonged to Ana Gradecak from Croatia. At the 2018 World Para Athletics European Championships in Berlin, Germany, she took the bronze medal in the shot put F41 event . She won the silver medal in the shot put F41 event of the 2021 World Para Athletics European Championships in Bydgoszcz, Poland.

References

1998 births
Living people
Sportspeople from Malatya
Female competitors in athletics with disabilities
Turkish female shot putters
Turkish female discus throwers